Evaporated milk, known in some countries as "unsweetened condensed milk", is a shelf-stable canned cow’s milk product where about 60% of the water has been removed from fresh milk. It differs from sweetened condensed milk, which contains added sugar.  Sweetened condensed milk requires less processing to preserve since the added sugar inhibits bacterial growth.  The production process involves the evaporation of 60% of the water from the milk, followed by homogenization, canning, and heat-sterilization.

Evaporated milk takes up half the space of its nutritional equivalent in fresh milk. When the liquid product is mixed with a proportionate amount of water (150%), evaporated milk becomes the rough equivalent of fresh milk. This makes evaporated milk attractive for some purposes as it can have a shelf life of months or even years, depending upon the fat and sugar content. This made evaporated milk very popular before refrigeration as a safe and reliable substitute for perishable fresh milk, as it could be shipped easily to locations lacking the means of safe milk production or storage.

As infant formula
In the 1920s and 1930s, evaporated milk began to be widely commercially available at low prices.  The Christian Diehl Brewery, for instance, entered the business in 1922, producing Jerzee brand evaporated milk as a response to the Volstead Act.  Several clinical studies from that time period suggested that babies fed evaporated milk formula thrived as well as breastfed babies. Modern guidelines from the World Health Organization consider breastfeeding, in most cases, to be healthier for the infant because of the colostrum in early milk production, as well as the specific nutritional content of human breast milk.

Production 
 
Evaporated milk is made from fresh, homogenized milk from which 60% of the water has been removed. After the water has been removed, the product is chilled, stabilized, sterilized and packaged.  It is commercially sterilized at 240–245 °F (115–118 °C) for 15 minutes. A slightly caramelized flavor results from the high heat process (Maillard reaction), and it is slightly darker in color than fresh milk. The evaporation process concentrates the nutrients and the food energy (kcal); unreconstituted evaporated milk contains more nutrients and calories than fresh milk per unit volume.

Additives
Evaporated milk generally contains disodium phosphate (process aid to prevent coagulation) and carrageenan (to "stabilise", i.e. prevent solids settling) as well as added vitamins C and D.

Reconstitution and substitution

Evaporated milk is sometimes used in its concentrated form in tea or coffee, or as a topping for desserts. Reconstituted evaporated milk, roughly equivalent to normal milk, is mixed 1 part by volume of evaporated milk with 1 1/4 parts of water.

In the United States 
According to the United States Code of Federal Regulations, Title 21, Chapter 1, Part 131, Sub part B, Section 130  "Evaporated milk", (April 2006) 
    (a) Description. Evaporated milk is the liquid food obtained by 
partial removal of water only from milk. It contains not less than 6.5 
percent by weight of milk fat, not less than 16.5 percent by weight of 
milk solids not fat, and not less than 23 percent by weight of total 
milk solids. Evaporated milk contains added vitamin D as prescribed by 
paragraph (b) of this section. It is homogenized. It is sealed in a 
container and so processed by heat, either before or after sealing, as 
to prevent spoilage.
...
Sections (b)–(f) of the above code regulate vitamin addition, optional ingredients, methods of analysis, nomenclature, and label declaration.

Canada 
Evaporated milk in Canada is defined to be milk from which water has been evaporated, and contains at least 25% milk solids and 7.5% milk fat. It may contain added vitamin C if a daily intake of this product contains between 60 and 75 milligrams, and may also contain vitamin D in an amount no less than 300 International Units and no more than 400 International Units. Disodium phosphate or sodium citrate (or both) may be added, as well as an emulsifying agent.

Shelf life 
The shelf life of canned evaporated milk varies according to both its added content and its proportion of fat. For the regular unsweetened product a life of fifteen months can be expected before any noticeable destabilization occurs.

Notable producers 
Evaporated milk is sold by several manufacturers:

 Carnation Evaporated Milk (the brand is now owned by Nestlé and licensed to Smuckers in Canada)
 Dairy Isle (Canada by ADL)
 PET Evaporated Milk (now owned by Smuckers)
 Magnolia evaporated milk - (now produced by Eagle Family Foods owned by Smuckers )
 Viking Melk (Norway) - invented by Olav Johan Sopp in 1891, a Nestlé brand since 1897
 F&N Evaporated Milk
 California Farms Evaporated Milk
 Rainbow Milk, a brand of Royal Friesland Foods
 Nordmilch AG (Now DMK Deutsches Milchkontor) - Germany
 Jerzee Evaporated Milk (purchased in 2006 from Diehl Food Products)
 O-AT-KA Evaporated Milk
 Ferdi Evaporated Milk (Malaysia)
 Vitalait Evaporated Milk (Senegal)
 Luna Evaporated Milk (Saudi Arabia)
 Gloria Evaporated Milk (Peru)

See also 

 Baked milk
 Condensed milk
 Filled milk
 John Augustus Just
 List of dried foods
 Powdered milk
 Scalded milk

References

External links 

 Cooking with Canned Milk, including recipes and tips 
 PET History – history of evaporated milk and the PET company.
 Today in Science History – John B. Meyenberg's patent describing his evaporation process of preserving milk

Milk-based drinks
Canned food